Shawangunk may refer to:

In New York
Shawangunk, New York, a town in Ulster County
Shawangunk Correctional Facility, in Ulster County
Shawangunk Grasslands National Wildlife Refuge, in Ulster County
Shawangunk Kill, a tributary of the Wallkill River
Shawangunk Ridge, also known as the Shawangunk Mountains or The Gunks

In Michigan
the former name of Charity Island

In geology
Shawangunk Formation